Justice Clark may refer to:

 Albert M. Clark (1879–1950), associate justice of the Supreme Court of Missouri
 Andrew Inglis Clark (1848-1907), Senior justice of the Supreme Court of Tasmania
 Cornelia Clark (born 1950), associate justice of the Tennessee Supreme Court
 George H. Clark (1872-1943), associate justice of the Ohio Supreme Court
 George M. Clark (1875-1951), chief justice of the Michigan Supreme Court
 Greenleaf Clark (1835-1904), associate justice of the Minnesota Supreme Court
 James Waddey Clark (1877-1939), associate justice of the Oklahoma Supreme Court
 Lewis Whitehouse Clark (1828–1900), associate justice and chief justice of the New Hampshire Supreme Court
 Marcus R. Clark (born 1956), associate justice of the Louisiana Supreme Court
 Tom C. Clark (1899-1977), associate justice of the United States Supreme Court
 Walter Clark (judge) (1846-1924), associate justice and chief justice of the North Carolina Supreme Court
 William G. Clark (1924-2001), associate justice and chief justice of the Illinois Supreme Court
 William P. Clark Jr. (1931-2013), associate justice of the California Supreme Court

See also
Judge Clark (disambiguation)
Justice Clarke (disambiguation)